Kyaw Zin is a Burmese swimmer. He competed at the 2008 Summer Olympics.

External links
 
Beijing Olympics: Myanmar to send six athletes to the Games

Living people
Year of birth missing (living people)
Swimmers at the 2008 Summer Olympics
Olympic swimmers of Myanmar
Burmese male swimmers
Place of birth missing (living people)
21st-century Burmese people